Micklefield is a civil parish in the metropolitan borough of the City of Leeds, West Yorkshire, England.  The parish contains six listed buildings that are recorded in the National Heritage List for England.  All the listed buildings are designated at Grade II, the lowest of the three grades, which is applied to "buildings of national importance and special interest".  The parish contains the village of Micklefield and the surrounding countryside.  The listed buildings consist of a farmhouse, two farm buildings, two railway bridges, one an overbridge and the other an underbridge, and a milepost.


Buildings

References

Citations

Sources

Lists of listed buildings in West Yorkshire